The Basque diaspora is the name given to describe people of Basque origin living outside their traditional homeland on the borders between Spain and France. Many Basques have left the Basque Country for other parts of the globe for economic and political reasons, with substantial populations in Chile, Colombia, Argentina and Uruguay with those of Basque ancestry in the hundreds of thousands; Peru, Venezuela, Guatemala, Canada, and the United States.

Notably, the Basque diaspora is sometimes referred to as "the eighth province", indirectly referring to the historical seven Basque provinces.

South America

Argentina 

People of Basque descent make up 10% of Argentina's population, and it was a major destination for Basques emigrating from both Spain and France in the 19th and 20th centuries. Basques have left an indelible imprint on Argentine culture and politics, with many place names and surnames, including those of several Presidents. After several generations, a sense of Basque heritage is still strong, maintained through numerous Basque cultural centres in major cities. Argentine sportspeople with Basque surnames have frequently been nicknamed El Vasco.

Chile 

The Basques arrived in Chile in the 18th century from their homeland in northern Spain (see Basque Provinces) and parts of southwestern France, as merchants and due to their hard work and entrepreneurship, rose to the top of the social scale and intermarried into the Chilean elites of Castilian descent. This union is the basis of the Chilean elite of today. The Basque settlers also intermarried into the Mestizo population of central Chile  in the middle of the colonial period to form the large Castizo population that exists in Chile today; Castizos and Mestizos makeup modern lower-middle and lower classes; other Basque settlers also intermarried with mestizos of Castilian descent. Thousands of Basque refugees fleeing the Spanish Civil War in 1939 also settled and have many descendants in the country and have even intermarried with other Spanish ethnic groups other than Castilians as well as other European ethnic groups. Population estimates of Basque-Chileans range from 10% (1,600,000) to as high as 27% (4,500,000).<ref>Contacto Interlingüístico e intercultural en el mundo hispano.instituto valenciano de lenguas y culturas. Universitat de València Cita: " Un 20% de la población chilena tiene su origen en el País Vasco".</ref>El 27% de los chilenos son descendientes de emigrantes vascos.  DE LOS VASCOS, OÑATI Y LOS ELORZA Waldo Ayarza Elorza.

Miguel de Unamuno stated that two things could be clearly attributed to the Basques: The Jesuits  and the Republic of Chile
.

 Colombia 

Colombia was one of early focus of Basque immigration; it is estimated that at least 40% of the Coffee Axis and Antioquia's population have Basque origin (2,800,000 people). Between 1640 and 1859, 18.9% of the residents of Colombia were of Basque origin, making it possible for demographers to predict that nowadays more than half of the country has this ancestry (25,000,000 people). It has been suggested that the present day incidence of business entrepreneurship in the region of Antioquia is attributable to the Basque immigration and Basque character traits. The current Spanish dialect in Antioquia, closely observed, has obvious influences from Basque. Basque influence is evident in words such as 'ma' (mother), 'coscorria' (useless, inept) and 'tap' (tap), to name only a few cases. Basques began to immigrate regularly and are distributed throughout the country. Due to this presence is that the Colombian department of Antioquia has been considered a major route of the Basque-Navarre immigration, mainly during the colonial era, when hundreds of Basques migrated to be linked to the Spanish colonization companies. It is estimated, for example, for the Department of Antioquia (a region where hundreds of Spaniards arrived, of which a good portion were Basque) some limited aspects of the culture and traditions were brought by Basque settlers. Many point to Basque origins as a way to understand the population's idiosyncrasies. Prominent among these, were two American historians: Everett Hagen and Leonard Kasdan. Hagen looked up the phone in Medellin in 1957 and found that 15% of the surnames were Basques, of Basque origin, finding then that employers in the percentage of surnames was up to 25%, which led it to conclude that the inheritance of Basque was very important to explain the increased industrial development of Antioquia in the Colombian context. These ideas were supported by representatives of developmental theories, who sought to justify business growth based on "the character of social groups." There also seems to be some Basque gastronomical influence in the Antioquia region. It is said that the "arepa" might have been influenced by the Basque "talo".

 Cuba 

Jon Bilbao's book Vascos en Cuba, 1492–1511, published in 1958, examines the Basque presence on the island of Cuba during the initial transatlantic exploration period and is the predecessor of the volume Basques in Cuba,
Edited by
William A. Douglass, (Center for Basque Studies Press
University of Nevada, Reno). Although there is
information about the Basques in Cuba during the colony's first centuries,
particularly in Havana, it was not until the mid-eighteenth century that
certain prominent men whose origins were directly connected with the
Basque Country made their mark on the island's society. The cultural trace of the Basques on the island has been considerable
for various centuries in spite of the relatively small size of the Basque
colony in Cuba. The
Centro Euskaro, was founded in Havana in 1908 as a recreational and
cultural society for the Basques and Navarrese in Cuba, following a pattern set in other capital cities in the Americas.

 Peru 

A notable percentage of Peruvian people have at least one Basque surname, with more than 6 million or 18% of the national population. They trace back their presence to colonial times.

 Uruguay 

It is estimated that up to 10% of Uruguay's population has at least one parent with a Basque surname. The first wave of Basque immigrants to Uruguay came from the French side of the Basque country beginning about 1824.

 Venezuela 

The first wave of Basque immigration to Venezuela consisted of Conquerors and Missionaries, during the Colonization of Venezuela. The second wave of Basque immigration started in 1939, as a result of the Spanish Civil War.

 North America 

 Canada 

See also History of Newfoundland and Labrador.

 Mexico 

An estimated 2% of Mexicans have some amount of Basque descent, and that community has increased in size from immigration from Spain in the early 20th century.  The Spanish Civil War in the 1930s brought over tens of thousands of refugees from the Basque Country to political asylum in Mexico and Latin America.

Most Mexicans of Basque descent are concentrated in the cities of Monterrey, Saltillo, Camargo, and the states of Jalisco, Zacatecas, Durango, Nuevo León, Tamaulipas, and Coahuila. The Basques were important in the mining industry, many were ranchers and vaqueros (cowboys), and the rest small shops owners in major cities like Mexico City, Guadalajara and Puebla.

Basque names are found in many places throughout north central and Northeastern Mexico, such as Durango, Victoria, Zuazua and Arramberri - the first province in the north of the Viceroyalty of New Spain (Mexico) to be explored and settled by the Spanish, Nueva Vizcaya, comprised the territory of today's states of Chihuahua and Durango.

Many notable Mexicans have been of Basque extraction, such as Agustín de Iturbide, emperor of the First Mexican Empire, Sor Juana Inés de la Cruz, seventeenth century conquistador Juan de Oñate, Francisco "Pancho" Villa, Vicente Fox, as well as directors and actors: María Félix, Dolores del Río, and Alejandro González Iñárritu.

 United States 

There are about 57,000 people of Basque descent living in the United States, according to the 2000 census. This number is highly disputed, however, since before the 1980 census there had never been a federally recognized category for Basques.  As a result, Basques were usually categorized as Spanish or French. It is speculated that there are many more Americans of Basque descent who still classify themselves as Spanish, French or Latin American.

The largest concentration of Basque Americans is in the Boise, Idaho, area, where approximately 15,000 Basque Americans live. Boise is home of the Basque Museum and Cultural Center and hosts a large Basque festival known as Jaialdi every five years. They also host a number of other Basque festivals, including the San Inazio Festival each summer and there are many Basque restaurants located in Boise. A large majority of the Boise Basque community traces its ancestry to Bizkaia (Vizcaya in Spanish, Biscay in English) in northern Spain.

In South Texas along the Mexican-Texan border of the Rio Grande Valley, many people are of Basque heritage or have Basque surnames. Along this area are many ranches given to colonial Spanish settlers from Basque Country to New Spain, which still exist today. They are mostly descendants of settlers from Spain and Mexico, with a number from other parts of Hispanic America.

Other significant Basque populations in the United States are located in Reno, Nevada, the San Francisco Bay Area, and the Central Valley region of California. In Winnemucca, Nevada, there is an annual Basque festival that celebrates the dance, cuisine and cultures of the Basque peoples of Spanish, French and Mexican nationalities who arrived in Nevada in the late 19th century. Reno is home to the nation's only Basque Studies Department at the University of Nevada.  There also exists a history of Basque culture in Chino, California. In Chino, there are two annual Basque festivals that celebrate the dance, cuisine, and culture of the peoples, and the surrounding area of San Bernardino County has many Basque descendants.

There has been a Basque presence in the Americas from the age of Columbus.  Basques under the crown of Castile were among the explorers, priests and conquistadors of the Spanish Empire. Placenames like Durango, Colorado, Trepassey, Biscayne Cove and Biscayne Bay commemorate these individuals.  Basques began to come to English-speaking America during the 1848 California Gold Rush.  The first wave of Basques were already part of the diaspora who were living in Chile and Argentina and came when they heard word of the discovery of gold. When the gold rush did not pan out for most Basque immigrants, the majority turned to ranching and sheep-herding in California's Central Valley, and later in northern Nevada and southern Idaho.  Many more Basques arrived from the Basque Country upon hearing of the success of their comrades in America.

Basque immigration was effectively cut off by the 1921 National Origins Quota Act.  Basque immigration was restored by Nevada Senator McCarran's 1952 immigration act, which allowed a quota of 500 Basques (technically 'Spanish Sheep Herders').

 Saint-Pierre et Miquelon 
Saint-Pierre et Miquelon is a self-governing territorial overseas collectivity of France, situated in the northwestern Atlantic Ocean near Canada. The name "Miquelon" is a Basque form of Michael. The islands were frequented by Basque fisherman prior to Portuguese discovery in 1520. Today, there are many people of Basque descent residing there. The Basque flag appears on the unofficial flag of Saint-Pierre et Miquelon.

Europe
 Soviet Union 

During the Spanish Civil War, countries like the United Kingdom, Belgium, the Netherlands and the Soviet Union (Russia) offered to spare Spanish Republican children from the toil of war.

They embarked mainly from the Basque ports in the Bay of Biscay.

In the 1950s or 1960s, many people went to the west of US during World War II, owing to an economic crisis. But in the US, they started working as sheepherders. When arriving there, their conditions were hard because they were living in a place they have never been before, talking in a different language that they did not learn when they were children. But they were alone, they do not have any family or friends there, and they can not talk with nobody. Also, the wind and cold winters were terrible for them. To sum up, they look after the sheep and some of them listen to the radio or play the guitar in their long days not to be bored.

But since the Soviet Union refused to recognize Francoist Spain, the Spanish children in Russia (mostly born to Basque communists) spent the Second World War and the following decades in the Soviet Union, many of them forming families with Soviet citizens.

Some of them migrated to Cuba after the Cuban Revolution.
 
Now the survivors live in Russia as retirees with help from the Spanish governments.

 Asia 
There is a small, but thriving Basque population based in Asia. Some of the first Christian missionaries in Asia were of Basque descent, such as the Jesuit Francis Xavier who died on Sancian Island off the Chinese Coast. The Jesuit Pedro Arrupe was a witness of the Hiroshima atomic bomb in 1945.

 Philippines 

Basque immigrants comprised a big part, if not most, of the Spanish expatriate population of the Philippines during the Spanish colonial period. Most of them were soldiers and sailors in the military and navy of the viceroyalty of New Spain, merchants, missionaries, and clergy. Families of Basque ancestry, over time, slowly integrated into the Philippine social landscape, developing themselves into some of the most prominent families in the country. Basque descendants in the Philippines today consider themselves to be Filipinos and remain influential in the business and political sectors of the country. They include the Aboitiz family, the Zobel de Ayala family, the Araneta family and political clans like the Zubiri and the Ozámiz families.

 In documentaries 

 2012 Guk, we (Nuria Vilalta)
 2010 Amerikanuak (Gorka Bilbao and Nacho Reig)
 2007 ¡Gora Vasco! (Milonga de temple y carretilla)'' (Roberto Arizmendi)

See also
Carlos Loyzaga
Azcárraga family
Balmaceda family
Larraín family
Juana Inés de la Cruz
Agustín de Iturbide
Che Guevara
Simón Bolívar
Pedro Arrupe
Thunder in the Sun
Francis Xavier
José Mujica
List of Basques

References

External links
The Basque Club of North Queensland, Australia
Center for Basque Studies, University of Nevada, Reno
Cenarrusa Center for Basque Studies, Boise State University
Basque organization working with the diaspora, Bayonne
 "Basques Around the World, Generic Emigrants or Diaspora?" by Gloria P. Totoricagüena: 

 
People of Basque descent
Human migration
Basque culture
European diasporas